James Henry Porter (30 July 1892 – 12 December 1936) was an Australian rules footballer who played with Fitzroy in the Victorian Football League (VFL).

Notes

External links 

1892 births
1936 deaths
Australian rules footballers from Victoria (Australia)
Fitzroy Football Club players